In quantum group, Hopf algebra and weak Hopf algebra, the Doi-Hopf module is a crucial construction that has many applications. It's named after Japanese mathematician Yukio Doi (土井 幸雄) and  German  mathematician Heinz Hopf. The concept was introduce by Doi in his 1992 paper "unifying Hopf modules".

Doi-Hopf module 

A right Doi-Hopf datum is a triple  with  a Hopf algebra,  a left -comodule algebra, and  a right -module coalgebra. A left-right  Doi-Hopf -module  is a left -module and a right -comodule via  such that  for all . The subscript is the Sweedler notation.

A left Doi-Hopf datum is a triple  with  a Hopf algebra,  a right -comodule algebra, and  a left -module coalgebra. A Doi-Hopf module can be defined similarly.

Doi-Hopf module in weak Hopf algebra 

The generalization of Doi-Hopf module in weak Hopf algebra case is given by Gabriella Böhm in 2000.

References 

Hopf algebras